Perdikaki (before 1930: Σακαρέτσι - Sakaretsi) is a village and a community located in the northeastern part of Aetolia-Acarnania.  It belongs to the municipal unit of Inachos. According to the 2011 census  the population was 356 for the village, and 403 for the community, which includes the village Pigadia. The altitude is about 700 meters.  The mountain road to Patiopoulo rises to an altitude of 1,160 metres.

For the village's history, see The Sakaretsi by Pavlos Karakostas (Athens 1999)

Notable people 
Pavlos Karakostas (1937-2002) author

External links
Perdikaki on GTP Travel Pages (in English and Greek)

See also

List of settlements in Aetolia-Acarnania

References 

Populated places in Aetolia-Acarnania